Eukaryotic translation initiation factor 4 gamma 1 is a protein that in humans is encoded by the EIF4G1 gene.

Function 

The protein encoded by this gene is a component of the protein complex eIF4F, which is involved in the recognition of the mRNA cap, ATP-dependent unwinding of 5'-terminal secondary structure, and recruitment of mRNA to the ribosome. Alternative splicing results in five transcript variants encoding four distinct isoforms. eIF4G serves as a scaffold, interacting with mRNA and the other components of the eIF4F complex, as well as the PABP and eIF3.

Interactions 

Eukaryotic translation initiation factor 4 gamma has been shown to interact with MKNK1, EIF4A1, EIF4E, MKNK2 and PABPC1.

See also 
Eukaryotic initiation factor

References

Further reading